is a Japanese light novel series written by Takumi Toyoda with illustrations by Vania 600. 13 volumes have been published by Sohgeisha under their Sohgeisha Clear Bunko imprint; the series moved to Jitsugyo no Nihon Sha starting with the 14th volume; the 20th and last volume of the original series was published in December 2020.

A side story book with an added character was published on November 8, 2021. There is a new series with a different main character and a new illustrator, first printed in March 2021. The second new volume will come out on January 20, 2022.

A manga adaptation titled Rail Wars! Nihon Kokuyū Tetsudō Kōantai The Revolver was serialized in Mag Garden's Blade Online from 2012 to 2015. An anime television series adaptation aired between July and September 2014.

Plot
The series takes place in an alternate version of Japan where the nationalized railway system was never privatized (in real life, the Japanese National Railways were privatized in 1987). Naoto Takayama is an ordinary high school student who aspires to a comfortable life working on the Japanese National Railways. He ends up working as a security force trainee, where he unwillingly has to deal with his strange colleagues as well as RJ, a group of extremists who are fighting to privatize the railway.

Characters

While originally he wanted a peaceful life as a driver, he ended as the leader of the Fourth Guard Squad. He is a big train fan and he's very knowledgeable about all types and models. When he was young, he nearly fainted from gastritis, after he took a picture of a passing train.

She is the most fight-ready member of her team and claims she dislikes men. She's very athletic and it is later revealed that she has hidden feelings for Naoto, but refuses to show it. Her father is a police officer and that greatly influenced her, to the point that she can't differentiate between her job and the police.

A girl with a sweet demeanor. While she is not very physically strong, she has a good memory and enjoys studying. She has had a crush on Naoto since the time he saved her when she got lost in the railroad museum during their childhood.

The most easy going and physically fit member of the team. He always wears a yellow stab vest. He seems to have a massive appetite because he exercises efficiently.

Originally the leader of the Fourth Guard Squad, but after seeing Naoto's leadership skills, she resigns her position as leader and temporarily gives it to him. She has a cheerful personality and treats her subordinates kindly and equally, but can also be mischievous.

A friend of Naoto from school who joins the OJT a month after him. She has excellent hearing and enjoys listening to the sounds of trains. In the light novels, she seems to gain an interest in Shō after he rescues her, whilst in the anime, she seems to know a lot about Naoto and has a crush on him. She works as a waitress at the train station's restaurant usually frequented by the Fourth Guard Squad.

The instructor and commander of the Tokyo Security Force's mobile units. Despite being sometimes harsh, she deeply cares for the safety of the passengers. She is close friends with Nana.

A recently popular idol. She is the diva of the idol unit unoB, as well as writing the lyrics and composing the songs for the unit. In the anime, she develops a crush on Naoto after he saves her from a crazed man during a concert.

Media

Light novels
Rail Wars! began as a light novel series written by Takumi Toyoda, with illustrations by Vania 600. The first novel was published by Sohgeisha on January 16, 2012 under their Sohgeisha Clear Bunko imprint, and the last volume 20 of the original series was released on December 14, 2020.

New Light novels
A new series titled RAIL WARS! A introducing the main character of Daisuke Sakai was published in March 2021. The new illustrator for this series is Daito, known for his drawings of Armed High School Girls in the magazine MC ☆ Akushizu and on retail packages. The second volume will come out on January 20, 2022.

Light novel - side story
A side story book called Exp Keishi ☆ Tropical Front! was published in early November 2021 and introduced the character of Yasushi Yasukuni. It takes place at the same time as the main series and is located on the Sagami Bay coast of Izu at Atami.

Manga
A manga adaptation, titled  and illustrated by Keiji Asakawa, began serialization in Mag Garden's Blade Online magazine on 2012.

Anime
An anime television series adaptation animated by Passione aired on TBS from July 3, 2014, to September 19, 2014. The opening theme is titled  and is sung by Minori Chihara. The ending theme is titled OVERDRIVER and is sung by ZAQ. The anime has been licensed by Sentai Filmworks.

Video game
An adventure game developed by 5pb. for the PlayStation Vita was announced that was originally due for a November 27, 2014 release, until it was delayed.

On January 28, 2016, 5pb. and Mages. Inc. announced that the PlayStation Vita game was cancelled due to the game's development falling behind schedule and other "various circumstances".

Reception
Jacob Chapman from Anime News Network heavily panned Rail Wars! for being "pure fantasy and not even exciting fantasy" with its alternate version of the Japanese National Railway system, "fanatical infatuation" with Japanese train history and embarrassing fanservice innovation, calling it "a show fueled by uninteresting trivia, buffeted by desperate attempts at sex appeal and action-movie excitement on a shoe-string budget." By the series' end, he concluded that: "If you're a train and fanservice aficionado and have missed the ride so far, you might as well check it out now before it's completely (and deservedly) forgotten by the world."

References

External links
  
 RAIL WARS! Official Homepage ｜ TBS TV 
 Official game website 
 

2012 Japanese novels
2012 manga
2014 anime television series debuts
Action anime and manga
Anime and manga based on light novels
Cancelled PlayStation Vita games
Fiction about rail transport
Japanese alternate history novels
Light novels
Mag Garden manga
Passione (company)
Sentai Filmworks
Shōnen manga
TBS Television (Japan) original programming